Bradythrips is a genus of thrips in the family Phlaeothripidae.

Species
 Bradythrips anteromarginalis
 Bradythrips fuscus
 Bradythrips hesperus
 Bradythrips malayanus
 Bradythrips philippinensis
 Bradythrips zhangi

References

Phlaeothripidae
Thrips
Thrips genera